On Sunday, May 9, 2010, Major League Baseball pitcher Dallas Braden pitched a perfect game. Braden, a member of the Oakland Athletics, pitched the game against the Tampa Bay Rays and retired all 27 batters. The game took place on  Mother's Day in the United States and Braden's grandmother, Peggy Lindsey — who raised him after his mother died of cancer when he was in high school — was in attendance. Braden's battery mate during the game was Landon Powell, who was called up from the minor leagues 18 days before. It was the nineteenth perfect game in baseball history. Braden, who was 26 at the time, was the youngest pitcher to throw a perfect game since Mike Witt in 1984. The game was the Athletics' first no-hitter since Dave Stewart accomplished the feat on June 29, 1990, against the Toronto Blue Jays. Braden has since admitted to pitching the game while hungover.

Background

Controversy surrounding Braden

Before Braden threw his perfect game, controversy arose surrounding him after a game on April 22, 2010, when the Oakland Athletics and the New York Yankees played each other. During that game, Yankees third baseman Alex Rodriguez walked across the pitchers mound. Braden claimed that there was an unwritten rule in baseball that only the pitcher is granted access to the mound. Braden later recalled, "I don't care if I'm Cy Young or the 25th man on the roster, if I've got the ball in my hand and I'm on that mound, that's my mound." Rodriguez responded to the incident by saying, "He just told me to get off his mound. That was a little surprising. I'd never quite heard that, especially from a guy that has a handful of wins in his career."

Braden's grandmother
Braden's perfect game took place on May 9, 2010, Mother's Day in the United States. Braden grew up in the care of his mother, Jodie Atwood, until she died of cancer when Braden was in high school. From that point on, Braden was raised by his grandmother, Peggy Lindsey. Lindsey was in attendance during Braden's perfect game. After the game, Braden embraced his grandmother. Lindsey recalls, "It's very special. Dall[as] and I are very close. He just said, 'I love you,' and I said, 'Your mom would have been so proud.' I think that's what he was thinking, too." Athletics' catcher Landon Powell described the moment: "When we first finished the game and celebrated and I saw Dallas hugging his grandmother, I was tearing up...He's had a lot of things happen in his life, even in the last couple of years in the game of baseball, and it couldn't happen to someone who deserves it more."

Athletics' catcher Landon Powell
Landon Powell had only been a member of the 2010 Athletics for 18 days before he was called on to catch Braden on May 9, 2010. On April 21, Powell was called up to the majors from the Triple-A Sacramento River Cats after Oakland's second baseman Mark Ellis was placed on the disabled list the day before. Powell was originally being used as the back-up catcher behind Kurt Suzuki. Suzuki later sustained an injury and Powell was forced to move up on the depth chart. Braden later praised Powell for his work at the catcher position, "Landon and I — that's seamless. We've come up together. The guy's rock solid back there. I might have shaken [him off] once today. The guy knows my game inside and out." Powell also commented on the game, "I was nervous for him. I knew that we were going to call the same game we were calling the whole time, and it just [was a matter of] whether it would work out or not."

Hangover claim
Much like David Wells, Braden claims that he pitched the game hungover, saying: "The night before Mother's Day, though, I did [partake in libations or adult beverages]. We were getting after it a little bit." Video coordinator Adam Rhoden later noted that "You can recognize when a guy is hurting a little bit in the morning, I knew he'd probably had a night out. He didn't do his normal two-hour study that morning", while Powell said "That day, you could tell he was a little uncomfortable. He did panic that day a little more than he normally did."

Game

Before the game, during bullpen warm-ups, catcher Landon Powell asked Braden "how his stuff looked," to which Braden responded with a thumbs up. Braden later recalled that everything was normal and he did not feel that his pitches were different. The umpires during the game were Jim Wolf at home plate, Derryl Cousins at first base, Jim Joyce at second base, and Todd Tichenor at third base. Attendance for the game was 12,228 at the Oakland–Alameda County Coliseum in Oakland, California, which holds 35,067 people. The last out of the game came when the Rays' outfielder Gabe Kapler hit a ground ball to Athletics' shortstop Cliff Pennington. The game was the Athletics' first no-hitter since Dave Stewart threw one against the Toronto Blue Jays on June 29, 1990, and the first Athletics' perfect game since Catfish Hunter threw one on May 8, 1968, against the Minnesota Twins. It was also the second perfect game thrown against the Rays in under a year following Mark Buehrle's perfect game on July 23, 2009.

Linescore

Box score

FIELDING
E: Navarro, D (2, throw).
Outfield assists: Upton, B (Pennington at home).

BATTING
2B: Rosales (4, Shields), Powell (1, Sonnanstine).
TB: Sweeney, R 2; Chavez, Er; Barton 3; Rosales 2; Kouzmanoff 2; Pennington; Powell 3.
RBI: Powell (1), Kouzmanoff (18), Sweeney, R (19).
2-out RBI: Powell; Sweeney, R.
Runners left in scoring position, 2 out: Davis, R; Patterson, E 2; Powell; Barton.
Team RISP: 3-for-13.
Team LOB: 10.

Other info
Pitches-strikes: Shields 108-72, Wheeler, D 19-12, Sonnanstine 13-8, Braden 109-77.
Groundouts-flyouts: Shields 5-4, Wheeler, D 0-0, Sonnanstine 1-2, Braden 7-6.
Batters faced: Shields 30, Wheeler, D 4, Sonnanstine 4, Braden 27
Umpires: HP - Jim Wolf, 1B - Derryl Cousins, 2B - Jim Joyce, 3B - Todd Tichenor.
Weather: , cloudy.
Wind: 20 mph, In from RF.
Time: 2:07.
Attendance: 12,228
Venue: Oakland-Alameda County Coliseum

Reactions
After Braden's perfect game, and in the wake of his verbal altercation with Braden, Alex Rodriguez said,

Tampa Bay Rays right fielder Ben Zobrist said,

Aftermath
When the out was recorded, Braden ran toward first base in celebration, and was bear-hugged by first baseman Daric Barton as the pile-up began. The image of the bear hug was turned into a commemorative icon, which was posted at Oakland-Alameda County Stadium for the remainder of the 2010 season. Afterward, he went to the dugout, where his family was being brought out to the field, and hugged his grandmother tearfully for several moments. It was the highlight of Braden's career, as he would only pitch one more year in the majors due to shoulder injuries before officially announcing his retirement in 2014.

References
General references

Inline citations

2010 Major League Baseball season
Major League Baseball perfect games
Oakland Athletics
Tampa Bay Rays
May 2010 sports events in the United States
2010 in sports in California
2010s in Oakland, California
Baseball competitions in Oakland, California